Iván Daniel Alonso Vallejo (born 10 April 1979) is a Uruguayan former footballer who played as a striker.

Gifted with an excellent aerial ability, he was most noted for his Alavés stint, and spent the bulk of his professional career in Spain, playing for three teams and appearing in seven La Liga seasons, three each with Alavés and Espanyol.

Club career

Early years and Alavés
Born in Montevideo, Alonso started his professional career with local Club Atlético River Plate. After two seasons he moved to Spain's Deportivo Alavés, scoring eight league goals – often as a substitute – in first season while also being an important attacking element in the Basque side's UEFA Cup exploits, as he netted in the final against Liverpool, lost 5–4 in extra time; during his spell, he formed a formidable partnership with Javi Moreno (later of A.C. Milan).

After playing 2003–04 in the Segunda División, Alonso stayed in that tier, moving to Real Murcia and scoring 11 goals in his debut campaign. An undisputed starter from his arrival onwards, he added 14 in 40 matches in 2006–07 as the club returned to La Liga after a three-year absence.

Espanyol
In the 2007–08 season, Alonso was again the team's top scorer at 10, but they would be nonetheless immediately relegated. In January 2009, however, he returned to the top flight, joining RCD Espanyol for €2.4 million on a deal running until the end of the season and two more. Benefitting from injuries and loss of form to legendary Raúl Tamudo he netted some important goals for the Catalans, including two at UD Almería on 23 May 2009 which guaranteed their permanence in the top division a further year.

On 23 September 2009, Alonso scored in the club's first win of the 2009–10 campaign, the first ever at new Estadi Cornellà-El Prat, against Málaga CF (2–1), and dedicated it to Daniel Jarque, deceased in the team's preseason in Italy. He would lose his starting job following the arrival, in January 2010, of Dani Osvaldo, on loan; however, on 11 April, one day after his 31st birthday, he managed to add his name to the scoresheet in Espanyol's 3–0 home victory over Atlético Madrid, having played only one minute after having replaced precisely the Argentine.

Late career
In June 2011, after 11 years in Spain (amassing professional totals of 344 games and 80 goals), the 32-year-old Alonso moved countries and signed with Deportivo Toluca F.C. of Mexico, being the Liga MX's top scorer in his first and only season even though the team could only rank in 12th position overall.

In early July 2012, Alonso left the Red Devils because of a heart condition, subsequently retiring from football – his doctor advised him not to play with Toluca as the high altitude of the city might worsen his condition. In early 2013, however, he returned to active, joining hometown's Club Nacional de Football. He scored 23 goals in the 2014–15 season, helping his team win the Uruguayan Primera División for the 45th time in history.

Alonso announced his retirement in April 2018, after two years in Argentina with Club Atlético River Plate. On 6 December 2021, he was appointed director of football of Mexico's C.F. Pachuca.

Personal life
Alonso's younger brother, Matías, was also a footballer and a forward. He too began his career at River Plate.

His cousin Diego Alonso also played several years in Spain.

Honours
Alavés
UEFA Cup runner-up: 2000–01

Nacional
Uruguayan Primera División: 2014–15

River Plate
Copa Argentina: 2015–16
Recopa Sudamericana: 2016

Individual
Liga MX top scorer: Apertura 2011; joint-top scorer Clausura 2012

References

External links

1979 births
Living people
Uruguayan footballers
Footballers from Montevideo
Association football forwards
Uruguayan Primera División players
Club Atlético River Plate (Montevideo) players
Club Nacional de Football players
La Liga players
Segunda División players
Deportivo Alavés players
Real Murcia players
RCD Espanyol footballers
Liga MX players
Deportivo Toluca F.C. players
Argentine Primera División players
Club Atlético River Plate footballers
Uruguayan expatriate footballers
Expatriate footballers in Spain
Expatriate footballers in Mexico
Expatriate footballers in Argentina
Uruguayan expatriate sportspeople in Spain
Uruguayan expatriate sportspeople in Mexico
Uruguayan expatriate sportspeople in Argentina